CS Politehnica Național Iași is a professional women's basketball team from Iași, Romania. The team plays in the Liga Națională, following their 2015–16 Liga I second place and promotion.

Honours
 Liga I
Winners (1): 2004–05
Runners-up (1): 2015–16

Current roster

References

External links
 Eurobasket 
 frbaschet.ro 

Iași
Sport in Iași
Basketball teams in Romania
Women's basketball teams in Romania
Basketball teams established in 1967
1967 establishments in Romania